The First All Russian Congress of Trade Unions took place in mid-January 1918. Following the Bolshevik seizure of state power, one of the key discussions was whether the trade unions should become "organs of governmental power".

Congress declared that:

Congress further resolved that:

Nevertheless Menshevik delegates repeatedly called an independent sphere of action for the unions.

References

1918 conferences